Consideration is a concept of English common law.

Consideration may also refer to:
"Consideration" (song), 2016

See also
For Your Consideration (disambiguation)